Box Frenzy  is the debut studio album by English rock band Pop Will Eat Itself. It was released on 26 October 1987 in the United Kingdom by Chapter 22 Records and in the United States by Rough Trade Records.

At the end of 1987, the NME ranked the album at number 49 in their list of the top 50 "Albums of the Year". Q also included it in their unordered list of the year's 50 best albums. In 2005, The Word included the album in the second part of its list "Hidden Treasure: Great Underrated Albums of Our Time."

Content
The track "There Is No Love Between Us Anymore" samples the songs "When I Fall In Love" by Nat King Cole, and "You've Lost That Loving Feeling" by The Righteous Brothers. Their better-known track "Hit the Hi-Tech Groove" not only samples the techno-disco song "Respectable" by Mel & Kim, as well as the Whistle song "Just Buggin'", but defiantly boasts that the band steals (though they actually sample) as many varieties of sounds that they can get to make their music, ranging from other people's songs to television soundbites.

Track listing

Bonus Tracks

Samples
Let's Get Ugly
 "Rock The Bells" by L.L. Cool J
There Is No Love Between Us Anymore
 "When I Fall In Love" by Nat King Cole
 "You've Lost That Loving Feeling" by The Righteous Brothers
Hit the Hi-Tech Groove
 "Stand and Deliver" by Adam and the Ants
 "Respectable" by Mel & Kim
 "Just Buggin'" by Whistle
"The Jack That House Built" by Jack 'N' Chill

Personnel
Pop Will Eat Itself
 Clint Mansell – vocals
 Graham Crabb – vocals
 Adam Mole – guitar
 Richard March – guitar
 Dr Nightmare – dance machine, sampling
with:
Ruth Joy - backing vocals on "Beaver Patrol" and "U.B.L.U.B."

References

External links
[ Box Frenzy – Bonus Tracks  (All-Music Guide)]
Box Frenzy (PWEINation) (Fansite)

Pop Will Eat Itself albums
1987 debut albums
Rough Trade Records albums